St. Rosalia's Church was a Baroque church that stood on Castle Hill in Ljubljana in the 18th century. Its construction began in 1708, but it was only completed in 1723. The church was heavily damaged in a fire in 1774 and pulled down in 1786. It was octagonal and was the first church in Ljubljana with a dome. It may have been built upon plans by the architect Carlo Martinuzzi. Today all that has been preserved of it are some remains of its walls in a children's playground on Castle Hill and presumably also the altar painting of Saint Rosalia, now kept by the Ursuline Convent in Ljubljana.

References

External links

Roman Catholic churches in Ljubljana
Baroque church buildings in Slovenia
18th-century Roman Catholic church buildings in Slovenia
Former Roman Catholic church buildings
Demolished buildings and structures in Slovenia
Buildings and structures demolished in 1786